Bunn High School is a public secondary school located in the town of Bunn, North Carolina, United States.

J. Melville Broughton was principal of the school many years before he became governor of the state.

Student Demographics

838 Students Enrolled

45% White
29% Hispanic
20% Black
5% Two or More Races
0.8% Asian
0.2% American Indian

Athletics
The school colors are green and gold, and the mascot is the wildcat.

The sports are:
Baseball
Basketball
Cheerleading
Cross country
Football
Color Guard / Dance
Golf
Soccer
Softball
Tennis
Track and field
Volleyball
Wrestling
Swimming

Notable alumni
 Tarik Cohen – running back for Chicago Bears
 Davanta Hinton/Kid Pheno – rapper 
 Troy Wheless (Class of 1999) – standout college basketball player for the College of Charleston
Cassandra Deck-Brown – Chief of Police Raleigh, North Carolina, Raleigh's first African American woman to hold that position.

References

External links 
 Bunn High

Public high schools in North Carolina
Schools in Franklin County, North Carolina